Lawrence County is  a county in the Commonwealth of Pennsylvania. As of the 2020 census, the population was 86,070. The county seat is New Castle.

Lawrence County comprises  the entire New Castle, PA Micropolitan Statistical Area, which is also included in the larger Pittsburgh-New Castle-Weirton, PA-WV-OH Combined Statistical Area.

History
Lawrence County was created on March 20, 1849, from parts of Beaver and Mercer counties due to the rapid growth of New Castle, which was primarily in Mercer County but was rapidly expanding into Beaver County. The former borders between Beaver and Mercer Counties are still evident in Lawrence County today, as the northern borders of North Beaver Township, Shenango Township, and Slippery Rock Township with (respectively) the southern borders of Mahoning Township, Hickory Township, and Scott Township make up the former boundaries between Beaver and Mercer Counties. In addition, County Line Road in New Castle where the Lawrence County Courthouse is located also marks the former boundaries.

The county was named after the flagship of Commodore Oliver Hazard Perry, the USS Lawrence, which was disabled in the 10 September 1813 Battle of Lake Erie during the War of 1812. The ship's complement included local raw recruits. That niagara-class brig (more correctly: snow) was itself a namesake, of Perry's friend and naval officer James Lawrence, who died during the War of 1812.

Geography
Major waterways are the Shenango River, Neshannock Creek and the Mahoning River which form the Beaver River. Also, the Slippery Rock Creek and Connoquenessing Creak empty into the Beaver River. It has a humid continental climate (Dfa/Dfb) and average monthly temperatures in New Castle range from 27.7 °F in January to 72.2 °F in July.

Adjacent counties
 Mercer County (north)
 Butler County (east)
 Beaver County (south)
 Columbiana County, Ohio (southwest)
 Mahoning County, Ohio (west)

Demographics

As of the 2000 census there were 94,643 people, 37,091 households, and 25,889 families residing in the county. The population density was 263 people per square mile (101/km2). There were 39,635 housing units at an average density of 110 per square mile (42/km2). The racial makeup of the county was 94.98% White, 3.61% Black or African American, 0.10% Native American, 0.27% Asian, 0.01% Pacific Islander, 0.19% from other races, and 0.84% from two or more races. 0.56% of the population were Hispanic or Latino of any race. 34.2% English or Welsh, 14.6% were of Italian, 12.4% American, 9.0% German, 8.1% Irish, and 6.8% Scotch-Irish, 2.5% Polish, and 1.9% African ancestry.

There were 37,091 households, out of which 28.80% had children under the age of 18 living with them, 54.50% were married couples living together, 11.50% had a female householder with no husband present, and 30.20% were non-families. 27.00% of all households were made up of individuals, and 14.40% had someone living alone who was 65 years of age or older. The average household size was 2.47 and the average family size was 3.00.

In the county, the population was spread out, with 23.10% under the age of 18, 8.30% from 18 to 24, 25.70% from 25 to 44, 23.60% from 45 to 64, and 19.30% who were 65 years of age or older. The median age was 40 years. For every 100 females, there were 90.60 males. For every 100 females age 18 and over, there were 86.90 males.

2020 Census

Micropolitan Statistical Area

The United States Office of Management and Budget has designated Lawrence County as the New Castle, PA Micropolitan Statistical Area (MSA).  As of the 2010 U.S. census the micropolitan area ranked 3rd most populous in the State of Pennsylvania and the 48th most populous in the United States with a population of 91,108.  Lawrence County is also a part of the Pittsburgh–New Castle–Weirton combined statistical area (CSA), which combines the population of Lawrence, and Allegheny, Armstrong, Beaver, Butler, Fayette, Indiana, Washington, and Westmoreland Counties in Pennsylvania.  In West Virginia, the counties included are Brooke and Hancock. And in Ohio, Jefferson County.  The combined statistical area ranked the fourth most populous in Pennsylvania and 20th most populous in the U.S. with a population of 2,660,727.

Government and politics
 

|}

As of February 21, 2022, there are 55,823 registered voters in Lawrence County.

 Republican: 26,478 (47.43%)
 Democratic : 22,567 (40.43%)
 Independent: 4,564 (8.18%)
 Third Party: 2,214 (3.97%)

County commissioners
 Morgan Boyd, Chairman, Republican
 Dan Vogler, Republican
 Loretta Spielvogel, Democrat

Other county officials
 Clerk of Courts and Prothonotary, Jodi Esoldo, Democrat
 Controller, Dave Prestopine, Republican
 District Attorney, Joshua Lamancusa, Democrat
 Register of Wills and Recorder of Deeds, Tammy Crawford, Republican
 Sheriff, Perry Quahliero, Democrat
 Treasurer, Richard Rapone, Democrat
 Coroner, Richard Johnson, Democrat

State House of Representatives
 Marla Brown, Republican, 9th district
Aaron Bernstine, Republican, 10th district
 Parke Wentling, Republican, 17th district

State Senators
 Elder Vogel, Republican, 47th district

United States House of Representatives
 Mike Kelly, Republican, 16th district

United States Senate
 John Fetterman, Democrat
 Bob Casey, Jr., Democrat

Education

Colleges
 Butler Community College Lawrence Crossing Campus
 Westminster College - New Wilmington

Public school districts
 Blackhawk School District (part)
 Ellwood City Area School District (part)
 Laurel School District 
 Mohawk Area School District
 Neshannock Township School District
 New Castle Area School District
 Shenango School District
 Union Area School District
 Wilmington Area School District (part)

Tech schools
 Lawrence County Career Technology Center - New Castle
 New Castle School of Trades - New Castle

Private schools

 Apple Grove School - New Wilmington
 Cherry Hill School - New Wilmington
 Cotton School - New Wilmington
 Ellwood City Children's Center, Inc.
 Faith Country Chapel Preschool and Kindergarten - New Castle
 Fayette School - Volant
 Hillside Parochial School - New Wilmington
 Indian Run School - New Wilmington
 J R Wilson School - New Wilmington
 Ligo School - New Wilmington
 Little Beaver Parochial School - Enon Valley
 Lusk School - Volant
 Meadow Lark School - New Wilmington
 New Castle Christian Academy - New Castle
 Parents Preschool Ellwood City
 Shepherd School - Volant
 St Vitus Catholic School - New Castle
 Thorn Hill School - Volant
 Westminster Preschool - New Wilmington

Per data provided at Pennsylvania EdNA

Libraries
 Ellwood City Area Public Library
 F D Campbell Memorial Library - Bessemer
 Lawrence County Federated Library System - New Castle
 New Castle Public Library

Transportation

Airports
 New Castle Municipal Airport

Public transit
 New Castle Area Transit Authority

Major roads and highways

Recreation

Parks
 Cascade Park (New Castle)
 Ewing Park (Ellwood City)
 Gaston Park (New Castle)
 McConnells Mill State Park (Slippery Rock Twp)
 Pearson Park (Neshannock Twp)
 West Park Nature Center (Union Twp)
 Marti Park
 New Wilmington Borough Park

State Game Lands
 SGL 148 (New Beaver)
 SGL 150 (Pulaski Twp)
 SGL 151 (Washington Twp near Volant)
 SGL 178 (Neshannock Twp north of New Castle)
 SGL 216 (Scott Twp near Harlansburg)

Trails
 North Country Trail (entire trail)
 North Country Trail (local)
 Stavich Bike Trail
Neshannock Creek Trail

Municipalities

Under Pennsylvania law, there are four types of incorporated municipalities: cities, boroughs, townships, and, in at most two cases, towns. The following cities, boroughs and townships are located in Lawrence County:

City
 New Castle (county seat)

Boroughs

 Bessemer
 Ellport
 Ellwood City (partly in Beaver County)
 Enon Valley
 New Beaver
 New Wilmington
 S.N.P.J.
 South New Castle
 Volant
 Wampum

Townships

 Hickory
 Little Beaver
 Mahoning
 Neshannock
 North Beaver
 Perry
 Plain Grove
 Pulaski
 Scott
 Shenango
 Slippery Rock
 Taylor
 Union
 Washington
 Wayne
 Wilmington

Census-designated places
Census-designated places are geographical areas designated by the U.S. Census Bureau for the purposes of compiling demographic data. They are not actual jurisdictions under Pennsylvania law. Other unincorporated communities, such as villages, may be listed here as well.

 Chewton
 Frizzleburg
 New Bedford
 New Castle Northwest
 Oakland
 Oakwood
 West Pittsburg

Unincorporated communities
Various unincorporated communities that lie within and are part of official municipalities.

 Altman
 Castlewood
 Cottage Grove
 Coverts
 Duckrun
 Eastbrook
 Edinburg
 Energy
 Gibsondale
 Grant City
 Harbor
 Harlansburg
 Hillsville
 Joyce
 McCaslin
 Moravia
 Mount Jackson
 Pulaski
 Rockville
 Rose Point
 Skidmore
 Sunset Valley
 Villa Maria
 Walmo
 Wiegletown
 Wurtemberg

Former community
 Big Beaver Borough- became a borough on March 7, 1958. Until that date it was known as Big Beaver Township which was formed in 1802 when South Beaver Township was divided. In 1849 when Lawrence County was created, the new county line split Big Beaver leaving a township of that name in each county. Big Beaver in Lawrence County is now known as New Beaver Borough.

Population ranking
The population ranking of the following table is based on the 2010 census of Lawrence County.

† county seat

See also
 National Register of Historic Places listings in Lawrence County, Pennsylvania
 Jordan Brown case

References

External links

 Tourism - http://www.visitlawrencecounty.com/
 Government - http://www.co.lawrence.pa.us/
 Economic Development - http://www.lawrencecounty.com/
 Chamber of Commerce - https://web.archive.org/web/20071006161144/http://www.lawrencecountychamber.com/
 Fishing - http://www.fish.state.pa.us/
 Hunting - http://www.pgc.state.pa.us/
 History - http://www.lawrencechs.com/

 
Pittsburgh metropolitan area
Populated places established in 1849
1849 establishments in Pennsylvania
Counties of Appalachia